The Chiesa della Madonna del Carmine is a Roman Catholic church located on Via Raia Occidentale in the town of Marsico Nuovo, province of Potenza, region of Basilicata, Italy.

History
The church and the adjacent monastery of San Tommaso di Canterbury were first erected between the 13th and 14th centuries. The sober neoclassical-style facade has a 14th-century main portal with four slender columns and a rounded marble arch. Inside the church is a 14th-century wooden sculpture depicting the Madonna and Child attributed to Giovanni di Nola.

References

Roman Catholic churches in Marsico Nuovo
14th-century Roman Catholic church buildings in Italy